Sarabi may refer to:

 Sarabi, a fictional lioness and the mother of Simba, the protagonist of The Lion King.
 Habiba Sarābi, an Afghan hematologist and politician.
 Abdul Wahed Sarābi, a former government minister of Afghanistan.